Amir Arsalan Heidarzad (born 13 March 1992 in Rasht) is an Iranian athlete.

Biography 
He started initially with gymnastics in 1373 and entered the field of martial arts - karate in the year 1374. He did his first international competition in year 2004 in Dubai and won the bronze medal. He was then invited to the national team camp in year 2006 and that same year, he went to the Sanker Cup in Belarus with the national team and achieved third place. He played in the Iranian Super League until year 2012. He was out of tournaments for 4–5 years and started body building. He has been playing in the Emirates World League since year 2016 and then the Spanish and Austrian matches. Currently, Heidarzad plays in the Emirates League at Al Nasr Club. He is the only Iranian Karate legionary in other countries.

National honors 
  Gold Medal, Doha Qatar Asian Championship Champion, 2006
  Bronze Medal, Team champion and third place Belarusian World Tournament- 2006 (Sanker Cup)
  Gold Medal, the champion of three courses Turkey International Championships- 2007,2008,2009
  Bronze Medal, Third Emirates Contactor International Competition, Dubai 2004
  Bronze Medal, Iran Development Team, Dubai 2009
  Gold Medal, International Police Championship of the Year 2018
  Gold Medal, Emirates League champions along with Al-Nasr 2018-2019
  Gold Medal, Champion of Baku International Tournament 2007

References

External links 

 

1992 births
Iranian male karateka
Sportspeople from Gilan province
Living people
20th-century Iranian people
21st-century Iranian people